Kaan Esener (born 1965) is a Turkish diplomat, current ambassador of Turkey to Council of Europe and former ambassador of Turkey to South Africa.

References

1965 births
Living people
Ambassadors of Turkey to South Africa
21st-century Turkish diplomats
Place of birth missing (living people)
Date of birth missing (living people)